Mallory Comerford (born September 6, 1997) is an American competitive swimmer specializing in freestyle events. Comerford was the winner of five gold medals at the 2017 World Aquatics Championships. She won USA Swimming's Golden Goggle Award for Breakout Performer of the Year for 2017. The following year, Comerford won eight medals in individual and relay events at the 2018 World Swimming Championships.

She is a member of the Cali Condors swim team, which is part of the International Swimming League.

Career

International Swimming League
In 2019, she was a member of the inaugural International Swimming League representing the Cali Condors, who finished third place in the final match in Las Vegas, Nevada in December. Mallory had success as a part of many Condors relays, including the 400-meter medley relay which never lost all season.

2016
In December 2016 at the World short course championships in Windsor, Canada, Comerford finished 5th in the 200 meter freestyle, and won two gold medals and one silver medal in relays.

2017
At the 2017 NCAA Championships, she won the 200 yards freestyle in a time of 1:40.36, tied with Katie Ledecky.

At the 2017 U.S. Nationals, she won the gold medal in the 100 meter freestyle in a new US Open record of 52.81, and also qualified for the 2017 World Aquatics Championships.

Comerford won her first long-course world title at the 2017 World Aquatics Championships in Budapest, Hungary, in the 4 × 100 m freestyle relay. She swam a national record in the individual 100 meter freestyle of 52.59 on the first leg. She went on to win a gold medal in each of the five available relays – three women's relays and two mixed relays. In the 4 × 100 meter mixed freestyle relay, Comerford and her teammates Caeleb Dressel, Nathan Adrian, and Simone Manuel broke the world record with a time of 3:19.60.

2018 World Championships
Comerford won a total of eight medals, 5 gold medals, 3 silver medals, and one bronze medal, spanning both individual and relay events at the 2018 World Swimming Championships in Hangzhou, China in December 2018.

2019
At the 2019 World Aquatics Championships, Comerford placed seventh in the 100m freestyle, and (with Zach Apple, Caeleb Dressel, and Simone Manuel) won the gold medal in the 4 x 100 mixed freestyle relay.

Awards and honors
 Golden Goggle Award Breakout Performer of the Year: 2017

References

External links
 
 

1997 births
Living people
American female freestyle swimmers
Sportspeople from Kalamazoo, Michigan
Louisville Cardinals women's swimmers
World Aquatics Championships medalists in swimming
World record holders in swimming